Great Western Railway (GWR) 4200 Class No. 4277 is a preserved British steam locomotive.  In preservation it has carried the name Hercules.

Service 

No. 4277 was built at the GWR's Swindon Works in 1920, on Lot No. 213, Works No. 2857.  It was painted in unlined green livery with "Great Western" on the tank sides. From 1934 a round GWR logo replaced the lettering, and this in turn was replaced in 1942 by the letters "G W R".  In 1948 the locomotive passed into British Railways (BR) ownership and was given the power classification 7F.  In BR ownership the livery was unlined black. It spent most of its working life in South Wales on freight trains and was withdrawn in 1964 from Aberbeeg Shed (BR shed code 86H) after 44 years of service.

Preservation 
4277 was moved to Woodham Brothers scrapyard in Barry, Glamorgan shortly after withdrawal and remained there for 20 years until 1986 when it was privately purchased.

In 2008 it was sold to the Dartmouth Steam Railway. The locomotive was then painted in lined GWR Brunswick Green livery.  On 1 August 2008 it was named Hercules, the nameplates being located on the smokebox. The nameplates are historically inauthentic for this locomotive.

The name Hercules was carried by three GWR locomotives, a broad gauge locomotive of the Hercules Class, the later 3031 Class No. 3043 and No. 16, one of the GWR 0-6-4 crane tanks.

References

Locomotives saved from Woodham Brothers scrapyard
4277
2-8-0T locomotives
Standard gauge steam locomotives of Great Britain